Pentrepiod Halt, Monmouthshire is a former railway station that was located approximately 2 miles north of Pontypool in Monmouthshire.

History 
The station was on the Great Western Railway's Newport - Pontypool - Blaenavon - Brynmawr Eastern Valley "Upper Level" line. The line opened to passengers in 1879 but the station at Pentrepiod was not added until 13 July 1912. As passenger services along the entire route were withdrawn on 5 May 1941 (ostensibly due to wartime economies, but they never resumed after hostilities ended), the station had an active life of less than 30 years. The line never generated much passenger traffic as it only served a number of small catchments and had only been opened (originally by the LNWR) as a competitor to the Great Western Railway  "Lower Line" which ran from Newport - Blaenavon along the valley floor, the two services sharing the same track from leaving the main line at Llantarnam until they diverged at Trevethin Junction just north of Pontypool Crane Street station.

The "Upper" line, which after Crane Street, called at Waunfelin Halt, Cwmffrwdoer Halt, Pentrepiod Halt, Pentwyn Halt, Abersychan & Talywain, Garndiffaith, Varteg, Blaenavon High Level, Waunavon and Brynmawr had an irregular, but approximately two-hourly service from around 06.00 - 23.00 (1938 timetable).

The "Lower" line had an hourly service and called at Pontnewynydd, Snatchwood Halt, Abersychan Low Level, Cwmffrwd Halt, Cwmavon Halt and Blaenavon Low Level and closed to passengers in 1962. The lower line track was lifted from Blaenavon to Trevethin Junction shortly afterward. However, the line "Upper" line continued to be used until 1980 for the considerable coal traffic from The Big Pit until its closure and a number of passenger specials were organised by rail enthusiasts between 1967 and 1980. The line was double track until 1965 when it was singled following the colliery closures. The track was lifted in summer 1983.

References 

Disused railway stations in Monmouthshire
Railway stations in Great Britain opened in 1912
Railway stations in Great Britain closed in 1941
Former London and North Western Railway stations
Disused railway stations in Torfaen
Former Great Western Railway stations
1912 establishments in Wales
1941 disestablishments in Wales